The 40 Made Me Do It is the debut album of Detroit rapper Dice. Released in 1992 by World One Records, the album was distributed by Raw Dogg Records. Extensive touring with Ultramagnetic MCs, Ice Cube and Da Lench Mob led to this album being a success, and Dice released his next album, The Neighborhoodshittalka, with Reel Life Productions.

Track listing

References

External links 

 The 40 Made Me Do It at Allmusic
 The 40 Made Me Do It at Discogs

1992 albums
Dice (rapper) albums